KIR, Kir or kir may refer to:

Biology
Inward-rectifier potassium channel Kir
Killer-cell immunoglobulin-like receptor, a receptor protein expressed on the surface of natural killer cells and some T-cells

Bodies of water
Kir (river), in northern Albania

 Kir Lake, near Dijon, France

People
Kir Fard, Armenian nobleman of the 12th–13th centuries 
Kir Nesis (1934–2003), Russian biologist
Kir Bulychev, Russian writer
Félix Kir (1876–1968), priest in the French Resistance 
Kir, a character in Detective Conan

Places
Republic of Kiribati in the central Pacific (ISO code: KIR) 
Kir of Moab, biblical stronghold
Land of Kir, biblical location

Transport
 Katihar Junction railway station, Bihar; station code KIR
 Kerry Airport, Ireland (IATA code: KIR)
 Kirkby railway station, Merseyside, England; National Rail station code KIR

Other
 Kir (cocktail), alcoholic beverage
 Kyrgyz language (ISO code: kir)
 Krajowa Izba Rozliczeniowa, an automated clearing house in Poland

See also
Kirs (disambiguation)
Kyr